Truxton may refer to:
Truxton, Arizona, a settlement south of the Grand Canyon in Mohave County, Arizona, USA
Truxton, New York, a town in Cortland County, New York, USA. 
Truxton (video game), a 1988 arcade game (known as Tatsujin in Japan)
Truxton II, a sequel
Truxton Bowl, a porcelain bowl presented to George Washington in 1794
Thomas Truxtun or Truxton, (1755-1822), American naval officer

See also
 New Truxton, Missouri
 Truxton Circle, Washington, D.C., a neighborhood
 Truxton Park - Hermitage, TN, a sub-division near Nashville, Tennessee, USA